Lauterbornia is a genus of midges in the bloodworm family (Chironomidae). Members of this genus live in cold water lakes in stenothermal or limited temperature change areas. Lauterbornia coracin is known for inhabiting oligotrophic or nutrient-depleted cold lake waters in the Northern Hemisphere.

References

Chironomidae
Nematocera genera